Lniano  is a village in Świecie County, Kuyavian-Pomeranian Voivodeship, in north-central Poland. It is the seat of the gmina (administrative district) called Gmina Lniano.

The village has a population of 1,200.

References

Lniano